This is a list of bestselling novels in the United States from 1895 through 1899, as determined by The Bookman, a New York–based literary journal.  Without the international copyright law which came into force in 1891, these volumes could have been printed and published by anyone, the change in this state of affairs made it possible to compile accurate sales figures.

Notable attempts to compile a list of best-selling books in the United States prior to 1895 include The Popular Book: A History of America's Literary Taste (1950) by James D. Hart.

1895

 Beside the Bonnie Brier Bush by Ian Maclaren
 Trilby by George du Maurier
 The Adventures of Captain Horn by Frank R. Stockton
 The Manxman by Hall Caine
 The Princess Aline by Richard Harding Davis
 The Days of Auld Lang Syne by Ian Maclaren
 The Master by Israel Zangwill The Prisoner of Zenda by Anthony Hope
 Degeneration by Max Nordau
 My Lady Nobody by Maarten Maartens

1896
 Tom Grogan by Francis Hopkinson Smith
 A Lady of Quality by Frances Hodgson Burnett
 The Seats of the Mighty by Gilbert Parker
 A Singular Life by Elizabeth Stuart Phelps Ward
 The Damnation of Theron Ware by Harold Frederic
 A House-Boat on the Styx by John Kendrick Bangs
 Kate Carnegie by Ian Maclaren
 The Red Badge of Courage by Stephen Crane
 Sentimental Tommy by J. M. Barrie
 Beside the Bonnie Brier Bush by Ian Maclaren

1897
 Quo Vadis by Henryk Sienkiewicz
 The Choir Invisible by James Lane Allen
 Soldiers of Fortune by Richard Harding Davis
 On the Face of the Waters by Flora Annie Steel
 Phroso by Anthony Hope
 The Christian by Hall Caine
 Margaret Ogilvy by J. M. Barrie
 Sentimental Tommy by J. M. Barrie
 Pursuit of the House-Boat by John Kendrick Bangs
 The Honorable Peter Stirling by Paul Leicester Ford

1898
   
 Caleb West by Francis Hopkinson Smith
 Hugh Wynne by Silas Weir Mitchell
 Penelope's Progress by Kate Douglas Wiggin
 Helbeck of Bannisdale by Mary Augusta Ward
 Quo Vadis by Henryk Sienkiewicz
 The Pride of Jennico by  Agnes and Egerton Castle
 The Day's Work by Rudyard Kipling
 Shrewsbury by Stanley J. Weyman
 Simon Dale by Anthony Hope
 (tie) The Adventures of François by Silas Weir Mitchell and The Battle of the Strong by Gilbert Parker

1899
 David Harum by Edward Noyes Westcott
 When Knighthood Was in Flower by Charles Major
 Richard Carvel by Winston Churchill
 The Day's Work by Rudyard Kipling
 Red Rock by Thomas Nelson Page
 Aylwin by Theodore Watts-Dunton
 Janice Meredith by Paul Leicester Ford
 Mr. Dooley in Peace and War by Finley Peter Dunne
 No. 5 John Street by Richard Whiteing
 The Market Place'' by Harold Frederic

References

Lists of bestselling novels in the United States
1890s in the United States
Novels
1890s books